Koerwitz Glacier is a low gradient glacier flowing northeast from Mount Griffith in the Hays Mountains of Antarctica to the Karo Hills. It was first seen and roughly mapped by the Byrd Antarctic Expedition, 1928–30. The glacier was named by the Advisory Committee on Antarctic Names for Peter H. Koerwitz, a biolab manager at McMurdo Station in 1965.

References

Glaciers of Amundsen Coast